Didymodon tomaculosus, the sausage beardmoss, is a rare moss in the United Kingdom which has been noted as an important species in Natural England's Farm Environmental Plan book, part of the Environmental Stewardship Scheme.

References

External links
Plantlife Profile

Pottiaceae